The Omaha Public Library in Omaha Nebraska currently has 12 locations.

W. Dale Clark Main Library 
W. Dale Clark Library in Omaha, Nebraska is the downtown location of the Omaha Public Library. Located at the intersection of 15th and Farnam Streets, across from the Gene Leahy Mall, the building is a modernist design, built in 1976. It was designed jointly by Hellmuth, Obata and Kassabaum and Latenser & Sons, Inc.,.  Principals in charge of the project were Gyo Obata for design, George Hagee for architecture, and Alan Lauck for interior design.  The project architectural designer was Masao Yamada, the architect Robert Barr, and the interior designer was Cheryl Coleman.

When W. Dale Clark Library opened in 1976, it completed a 20-year project to replace the original Omaha Library, which was located at 1823 Harney Street which was in operation from 1894 to 1976.  Plans moved the library's location more than 3 times from 19th and Dodge, to 16th and Dodge, to a joint plan to close Omaha Central High School and covert it into a museum and library, before the location of 15th and Farnam was chosen.  15th and Farnam was chosen as part of a $15 million revitalization plan to redevelop a 6-block area of downtown Omaha.

Bess Johnson Elkhorn Branch
The Elkhorn Public Library in Elkhorn, Nebraska first began in 1874; however no record of it exists from 1875 to 1925.  On February 15, 1925, Antlers Temple No. 24 Pythian Sisters took on the project for a local library.  With books donated by the Omaha Public Library, a small library was opened up at 110 Main Street.  In October of the same year, the library moved to the office of a local doctor named Doctor Brown.  The library was moved again 4 years later to a room of the Elkhorn Town Hall where it remained until 1966.

On June 12, 1966, the library was moved to an upstairs room at a new community center at 401 Glenn Street.  The library remained at the community center until 1996; however, a move to the lower level of the community center in 1982 nearly doubled the size of the library.  In June 1996, the Bess Johnson Elkhorn Public Library opened its doors to the public.  The new library building at 100 Reading Road was nearly 6 times larger than the lower-level room at the community center.

Due to the 2008 annexation of Elkhorn by Omaha, the Bess Johnson Elkhorn Public Library officially became the Bess Johnson Elkhorn Branch of the Omaha Public Library on March 1, 2008

South Omaha Library
The South Omaha Public Library was originally located at 2302 M Street in South Omaha, Nebraska. The most recent building, completed in 2008, features the city of Omaha's largest Spanish language collection and a large collection hosted in partnership between the City of Omaha, the Omaha Public Library and the Omaha's Metropolitan Community College.

First building
The original South Omaha Public Library was built in 1904 with a $50,000 grant to the City of South Omaha from the Andrew Carnegie Library Fund. The purpose of the grant was to design, build and equip the library. After buying a lot at South 23rd and M Streets, the City contracted prominent local architect Thomas Rogers Kimball to design a building. Built to resemble an Italian Renaissance palazzo, the building had two stories over a fully raised basement. The first story featured library services, while the second floor boasted a large auditorium for community events and speakers from across the Midwestern United States. The central feature of the exterior was an archway over the front doors, two symmetrical sidelights and two large arched windows on either side of the front entryway. Built of brick and limestone, the building featured a red clay tile roof, with oak woodwork throughout the interior. In 1915 South Omaha was annexed by the City of Omaha this library became the first branch of the Omaha Public Library system. In 1953 this building was demolished.

Second building
In October 1954 a new one-story building was constructed at the original location. It was officially closed on May 17, 2008.

Third building
A new, $6.9 million South Omaha Library opened on June 2, 2008 at 2808 Q Street. The Omaha Public Library partnered with the City of Omaha and the Metropolitan Community College (MCC) to build a new facility in 1999. There were a number of setbacks including tight budgets and a large community interest in keeping the building at its historical location. Construction began in 2006. Designed by Omaha's DLR Group and Engberg Anderson Design Partnership of Milwaukee, it adjoins MCC's South Omaha Campus, connected by a walkway over the bus terminal. The  building houses a computer lab, a state-of-the-art teen center, a larger reference and research space with a combined Omaha Public Library and MCC materials collection, an enhanced children's area and the city's largest Spanish language collection.

Charles B. Washington Branch
The Charles B. Washington Branch is a branch library of the Omaha Public Library located at 2868 Ames Avenue in North Omaha.

Original library service to North Omaha was a deposit station in a notions store.  The branch library was established in 1921 in an old church building at 25th and Ames Avenue.  It was called the North Omaha Branch. Within 10 years of the building service to the Omaha Public Library, the building began to deteriorate.

The old church building was replaced by a newly built library building in 1938 at 29th and Ames Ave.  The first 29th Street location served the community for 30 years before overcrowding made the building obsolete.  In 1972 a federal grant allowed the branch to be rebuilt again at the same location.  The 1972 location was designed by Dana Larson Roubal & Associates architects.
In 1986, the North Branch Library was renamed the Charles B. Washington Branch after a longtime civil rights advocate.

In 2006 a major renovation and expansion was completed focused on upgrading the exterior of the building and increased the technology available at the branch. Mayor Mike Fahey, performers from North High School and University of Nebraska at Omaha, and actor/rapper Ice-T attended. A new teen center is unique to Omaha's public library system, along with a large collection of African American materials. The library is also home to a new community technology center, along with a new outdoor sculpture reading garden. Omaha artist Yanna Ramaeker's two bronze sculptures and a giant birdcage containing bronze birds interpret Maya Angelou's poem "Caged Bird." Ramaeker designed the sculptures and garden to be a peaceful environment for reading and meditation.

Since 2002 the Omaha Community Kwanzaa Group has hosted an annual celebration at the branch. In 2007 it hosted StoryCorps oral history gathering exhibit, along with a presentation entitled "North Omaha Architectural History," which focused on Omaha architects Thomas Rogers  Kimball and Cap Wigington.

Former libraries
The Omaha Public Library draws its roots to the Second Library Association which existed from 1872 to 1877.  However, several current Omaha Public Library branches started off as independent libraries. The Benson Village Library, Bess Johnson Elkhorn Library, Millard Library, and the South Omaha Carnegie Library are all predecessors of Omaha Public Library branches.

See also
 History of Omaha

References

Libraries in Omaha, Nebraska
Public libraries in Nebraska